Johan Brunström and Frederik Nielsen were the defending champions, but Nielsen chose not to participate.  Brunström played alongside Nicholas Monroe, but lost in the first round to Roberto Bautista Agut and Stan Wawrinka.
Lu Yen-hsun and Jonathan Marray won the title, defeating Raven Klaasen and Leander Paes in the final, 6–3, 7-6(7–4).

Seeds

Draw

Draw

References
Main Draw

Doubles